Route 275 is a two-lane north/south highway in the Chaudière-Appalaches region in the province of Quebec. Its northern terminus is in Saint-Romuald, now part of Lévis at the junction of Route 132 and its southern terminus is in Saint-Côme–Linière at the junction of Route 173.

Towns along Route 275

 Saint-Côme–Linière
 Saint-Zacharie
 Saint-Prosper
 Saint-Benjamin
 Saint-Odilon-de-Cranbourne
 Sainte-Marguerite
 Sainte-Hénédine
 Saint-Isidore
 Saint-Jean-Chrysostome (Lévis)
 Saint-Romuald (Lévis)

See also
 List of Quebec provincial highways

References

External links 
 Route 273 on Google Maps
 Provincial Route Map (Courtesy of the Quebec Ministry of Transportation) 

275
Transport in Lévis, Quebec